Daniel Masson may refer to:

 Daniel Masson (cyclist) (born 1897), French cyclist
 Daniel Masson (composer) (born 1955), French composer

See also
 Daniel Mason (born c. 1976), American novelist and physician